Malkoo (Punjabi,) born as Muhammad Ashraf Malik (Punjabi,) is a Pakistani pop, Punjabi bhangra and folk singer.

He is best known for the song "Kala Jora Paa Sahdi Farmaish Tey", which was a hit in Pakistan.

Early life and career
Malkoo completed his Master of Arts degree from the Punjab University, Lahore and then went into the public entertainment business by releasing his first album in 2004. Malkoo was inspired by Pakistani folk singer Mansoor Malangi. He writes the lyrics of many of his own songs. Malkoo has done many overseas musical concert tours including in the United Kingdom, Canada and the United States.

Major popular hits
Malkoo released his first album Sochna Vi Na in 2004 and has since released many more albums.The song "Rul tay Gay Aan Chas bari aai ay" released on 2018  biggest smash hit and "Kala Chashma"
 "Sochna Vi Na" (2004)
 Mata Pa Spina Khwla (with Sehrish Khan)
 Kala Jora Paa Sahdi Farmaish Tey
 Wey Changa Sahda Yaar Ae Toon
 Aaja Sohniye Tenu Nachnaan Sikha Diya
 Chhaddo Sahnun Guddian Uddaan Deo
 Bhatti Dollar Kaman Challeya
 Nachdi Kamaal Billo
Malkoo Studio Season 1 (2018)
Malkoo Studio Season 2 (Wedding Session) (2021)

References

External links
Malkoo songs on Academy of the Punjab in North America (APNA) website

Year of birth missing (living people)
Living people
Punjabi people
Singers from Lahore
Pakistani pop singers
Punjabi-language singers
Bhangra (music)